Whangarata railway station was a station on the North Island Main Trunk, and in the Waikato region of New Zealand. It was originally known as Wangarata.

The station was opened on 20 May 1875, and was closed on 3 October 1966.

A deviation in 1914 allowed for an easier curve and gradient.

References

External links 
 Video of 3 freight trains climbing gradient

Defunct railway stations in New Zealand
Rail transport in Waikato
Buildings and structures in Waikato
Waikato District
Railway stations opened in 1875
Railway stations closed in 1966